Nachapkino is a rural locality (a village) in Milovsky Selsoviet, Ufimsky District, Bashkortostan, Russia. The population was 28 as of 2010. There are 5 streets.

Geography 
Nachapkino is located 27 km west of Ufa (the district's administrative centre) by road. Vetoshnikovo is the nearest rural locality.

References 

Rural localities in Ufimsky District
Ufimsky Uyezd